Walter Blair may refer to:
 Walter Blair (baseball) (1883–1948), American baseball player
 Walter Blair (folklorist) (1900–1992), American folklorist
 Walter Dabney Blair (1877–1953), American architect